Stjepan Kukuruzović (born 7 June 1989) is a Swiss-born Croatian professional footballer who plays as a midfielder for FC Lausanne-Sport.

Club statistics

Honours
FC Thun
Swiss Challenge League: 2009–10

FC Zürich
Swiss Cup: 2013–14

Ferencváros
Hungarian Cup: 2014–15
Hungarian League Cup: 2014–15

FC Vaduz
Liechtenstein Football Cup: 2015–16, 2016–17

References

External links
 

1989 births
Living people
People from Thun
Sportspeople from the canton of Bern
Association football midfielders
Croatian footballers
FC Thun players
FC Zürich players
Ferencvárosi TC footballers
FC Vaduz players
FC St. Gallen players
FC Lausanne-Sport players
Swiss Challenge League players
Swiss Super League players
Nemzeti Bajnokság I players
Croatian expatriate footballers
Expatriate footballers in Hungary
Croatian expatriate sportspeople in Hungary
Expatriate footballers in Liechtenstein
Croatian expatriate sportspeople in Liechtenstein